Aonchotheca is a genus of nematodes belonging to the family Capillariidae.

The genus was first described by López-Neyra in 1947.

The species of this genus are found in Eurasia and Northern America.

Species include:
 Aonchotheca forresteri (Kinsella and Pence, 1987)
 Aonchotheca putorii (Rudolphi, 1819)

References

Trichocephalida
Nematode genera